Anthony J. Casale (born October 7, 1947) is an American politician who served in the New York State Assembly from the 113th district from 1979 to 1995.

References

1947 births
Living people
Republican Party members of the New York State Assembly